Pawel i Gawel is a 1938 Polish comedy film directed by Mieczysław Krawicz and produced by the Rex-Film studio.

Cast
Eugeniusz Bodo as Paweł Gawlicki
Adolf Dymsza as Gaweł Pawlicki
Helena Grossówna as Violetta Bellami
Józef Orwid as Hubert, her manager
Halina Doree as Amelcia, landlady's daughter
Zofia Mellerowicz as Landlady
Tadeusz Fijewski as Stefek
Karol Dorwski as Reporter Lisek
Roman Dereń as The Editor
Irena Skwierczyńska as Gypsy Palmreader
Michał Halicz as Gypsy
Sergius Kwiek as Gypsy Leader
Zespół Cygański Kwieków as Gypsy Dancers and Musicians

References

External links
 
 Paweł i Gaweł at the Internet Polish Movie Database 
 

1938 films
1930s Polish-language films
Polish black-and-white films
1938 comedy films
Films directed by Mieczysław Krawicz
Polish comedy films